Frederiksværk station is a railway station serving the town of Frederiksværk in North Zealand, Denmark.

Frederiksværk station is located on the Frederiksværk Line from Hillerød to Hundested. The station was opened in 1897 with the opening of the Hillerød-Frederiksværk section of the Frederiksværk Line. The train services are operated by the railway company Lokaltog which runs frequent local train services between Hundested station and Hillerød station.

See also 
 List of railway stations in Denmark

References

External links

 Lokaltog

Railway stations opened in 1897
Railway stations in the Capital Region of Denmark
Railway stations in Denmark opened in the 19th century